The Connecticut Yankees were a soccer team based in Hartford, Connecticut and played their home matches at Dillon Stadium. They played in the American Soccer League for seven seasons, from 1972 to 1978, when they folded.

The team was established in 1972 as the Northeast United. They changed their name to the Connecticut Wildcats in 1973, and adopted the name Connecticut Yankees after the 1974 season. During their run they advanced to the playoffs once, in 1977, and were knocked out in the first round.

Year-by-year

Honors
Rookie of the Year
 1975: Roberto Taylor

Coaches
Bobby Kratzor
Rene Koremans

References

Defunct soccer clubs in Connecticut
Soccer clubs in Connecticut
American Soccer League (1933–1983) teams
1972 establishments in Connecticut
1978 disestablishments in Connecticut
Association football clubs disestablished in 1978
Association football clubs established in 1972